Stockton, California, held an election for mayor on June 7, 2016 and November 8, 2016. It saw Michael Tubbs unseat incumbent mayor Anthony Silva

Tubbs became the youngest mayor in Stockton's history and its first African American mayor.

Municipal elections in California are officially non-partisan.

2016 Election Results

First round

Runoff

References 

Stockton
Mayoral elections in Stockton, California
Stockton, California